Tropical Storm Cristina was the third tropical cyclone to make landfall along the Pacific Coast of Mexico in 10 days. On July 1, an area of disturbed weather developed into a tropical depression off the coast of Central America. The depression strengthened into Tropical Storm Cristina on July 2 as it moved west-northwest. Cristina was almost a hurricane at the time of its landfall near Puerto Ángel on July 3. The cyclone dissipated over the mountains of Mexico on the same day. Tropical Storm Cristina claimed 13 lives and left 62 missing. Eleven fishing boats were reported missing and 350 people were left homeless

Meteorological history

Cristina likely originated from area of thunderstorms that was affiliated with a tropical wave that had passed over Panama on June 29. By June 30, thunderstorm activity increased while located west the Pacific coast of Central America. At 1200 UTC July 1, as convective banding became organized, the National Hurricane Center initialed advisories Tropical Depression Five-E. At this time, the low located 300 miles (480 km) south of San Salvador, El Salvador. With warm water and low wind shear, meteorologists anticipated strengthening into a hurricane.

Quickly organizing, the depression was upgraded into Tropical Storm Cristina while 260 miles (420 km) south of Guatemala City, Guatemala.  During the night of July 1–2, the "tropical storm" peaked just under hurricane strength with winds of 70 mph (110 km/h) and a minimum pressure of 991 mbar (hPa). Early on July 3, the center of Tropical Storm Cristina crossed the Mexican coast near Puerto Ángel at peak intensity. Within six hours, Cristina had weakened into a minimal tropical storm over the mountainous terrain of Mexico. By early July 3, the remnants of the tropical storm had completely dissipated.

Preparations, Impact, and aftermath

On July 2, the Mexican government issued a tropical storm warning from the Mexico-Guatemala border to Punta Maldonado. Making landfall in the middle of the warning area, Cristina was the third storm to hit the region in less than two weeks. Tropical Storm Cristina dropped extremely heavy precipitation over southern Mexico and over 1,350 sites received rain.

One fisherman drowned, another went missing, and another was found alive after their fishing boat sank off the coast of Oaxaca. Flash flooding and mudslides in Oaxaca killed five and in Guerrero killed at least seven people died. In the latter state, 51 communities were flooded, thus leaving 350 people homeless. In addition, 62 people were declared missing when eleven fishing boats were reported missing on July 2. On July 18, the President of Mexico had a meeting for the victims of Boris and Cristina in Acapulco.

See also
1996 Pacific hurricane season
Other storms named Cristina

References

Cristina
Cristina 1996
Cristina 1996